The 1978 U.S. National Indoor Championships was a men's tennis tournament played on indoor hard courts at the Racquet Club of Memphis in Memphis, Tennessee in the United States that was part of the 1978 Colgate-Palmolive Grand Prix. It was the ninth edition of the tournament was held from February 27 through March 5, 1978. First-seeded Jimmy Connors won the singles title and $39,000 first-prize money. It was Connors' fourth title at the event after his three successive titles from 1973 to 1975, when the tournament was held in Salisbury, Maryland.

Finals

Singles
 Jimmy Connors defeated  Tim Gullikson 7–6, 6–3
 It was Connors' third singles title of the year and the 64th of his career.

Doubles
 Raúl Ramírez /  Brian Gottfried defeated  Phil Dent /  John Newcombe 3–6, 7–6, 6–2

References

External links
 Official website
 ATP tournament profile
 ITF tournament details

Volvo U.S. National Indoor
U.S. National Indoor Championships
U.S. National Indoor Championships
U.S. National Indoor Championships
U.S. National Indoor Tennis Championships
U.S. National Indoor Tennis Championships